, son of regent Masamichi, was a kugyō or Japanese court noble of the late Tokugawa shogunate and early Meiji periods. He held a regent position kampaku in 1863. After his biological son Sukemasa died young, he adopted a son of Kujō Hisatada, Hiromichi. In August 1872 he retired, and in November 1878 he died at age 70.

References
 
 Japanese Wikipedia

1807 births
1878 deaths
Fujiwara clan
Takatsukasa family